Buddhism has very liberal views in regards to healthy relationships, . Buddhism encourages independence through nonattachment. In order to be happy and to follow the path of enlightenment, Buddhism teaches people to discard all things in life that can cause pain. This idea is not referring to worldly objects in the physical sense, but in a spiritual sense. To achieve Nonattachment, one must detach from the idea of a perfect person and holding one’s partner to an impossible standard. Instead, one must accept a partner for who they are unconditionally. In Buddhism, this is the key to a good relationship. Accepting a partner for who they are throughout their life no matter what changes and making the best of every situation is how one achieves personal fulfillment in a romantic relationship.

The idea of unconditional love is essentially what Buddhism teaches. Marriage is a social construct that has changed vastly throughout the course of history. People married for a variety of reasons including status, wealth, power, and love. Buddhist text does not delve too deeply into the idea of marriage because Buddhism leaves the decision to marry up to each individual person. In Buddhism, marriage is not a religious obligation, a means for procreation, or a romantic notion of love. It is simply an option for each individual to make. If an individual believes marriage will bring them happiness and keep them on the path of enlightenment, then they are free to make that choice. Buddhism allows for each person to make the decision of whether or not they want to be married, how many children they want to have, and who they want to marry.

Buddhism does not provide rules or traditions about marriage. Instead, the philosophy offers advice to help a person live happily within a marriage. This advice is thought to help give people the best chance at a happy romantic relationship. In Buddhist text, the Buddha thought that the biggest hurdle in marriage is spousal weakness for other partners. He saw the weakness and trouble that other romantic interests can bring to a family and advised against it.

Buddhists do not prohibit divorce, but the idea of living the Buddhist lifestyle would suggest that divorce is not needed. If a person is living by the ideals of Buddhism and accepting someone for who they are and following the path of enlightenment, it stands to reason that they would never need a divorce because they would be satisfied with their marriage and their partner. Nonetheless, Buddhist text also states that separation is preferable to being miserable for a prolonged period of time. The philosophy prefers that a couple separate rather than live together and be counterproductive to personal fulfillment and enlightenment. Buddhism also states that to prevent divorce, older men should not have younger wives and older women should not have younger husbands. The claim was that the age difference would make them incompatible and cause problems leading to divorce. Overall, Buddhism says that any person is free to divorce, especially if it is hindering their path to personal fulfillment. However, it makes the important distinction that living a Buddhist lifestyle would mean creating a happy and strong relationship that would not end in divorce.

See also
 Buddhist view of marriage
 Buddhism and sexual orientation
 Buddhism and sexuality

References

Marriage in Buddhism